Ksenia Sergeevna Zakordonskaya (born 3 April 2003) is a Russian female handballer for HC Astrakhanochka and the Russian national team.

She participated at the 2021 World Women's Handball Championship in Spain.

References

External links

2003 births
Living people
Sportspeople from Astrakhan
Russian female handball players